Severina is the second album by Croatian singer Severina. It was released in 1992 by Croatia Records. The album marked the beginning of her collaboration with composer Zrinko Tutić.

Track listing
"Idemo se ljubiti" (Let's Kiss)
"Kad si sam" (When You're Alone)
"Budim se s imenom tvojim" (I Wake Up To Your Name)
"Kaži dal' je ljubav" (Tell Me Is It Love)
"Odlazim" (I'm Leaving)
"Zakuni se ljubavi" (Swear It, Love)
"Tvoja prva djevojka" (Your First Girlfriend)
"Zamisli" (Imagine)
"Baby, Baby" 
"Sve što imam, to si ti" (You're All I Have)

References

External links

1992 albums
Severina (singer) albums